Rewa Ultra Mega Solar is an operational ground mounted, grid-connected  photovoltaic solar park spread over an area of  in the Gurh tehsil of Rewa district of Madhya Pradesh, India. It started producing power in 2018 and reached its full capacity of 750MW in January 2020. The project was dedicated to the nation by the Prime Minister of India Shri Narendra Modi on July 10, 2020. It was the first solar project in India to break the grid parity barrier. It achieved a first-year tariff of INR 2.97/unit, while the previous record was INR 4.34/unit.

The project was commissioned by Rewa Ultra Mega Solar Limited, a joint venture between Madhya Pradesh UrjaVikas Nigam Limited and Solar Energy Corporation of India. The 750 MW capacity was auctioned in three packages of 250 MW each. RUMSL invited bids from solar power developers in January 2017. Twenty firms submitted bids, from which eighteen were shortlisted based on their financial and technical proposal to participate in the bidding process. The three winning bidders were Mahindra Renewables, Acme Solar, and Solenergi.

Rewa Solar Power Project has been awarded World Bank Group's President award for Innovation and Excellence.

It has been included in Prime Minister's Book of Innovation 2017.

About 24% of the park's produced energy goes to the Delhi Metro Rail Corporation, where it meets 60% of the daytime demand of the Delhi Metro.

References

Solar power stations in Madhya Pradesh
Rewa district
Energy infrastructure completed in 2018
2018 establishments in Madhya Pradesh